Jasmien Biebauw (born 24 September 1990) is a Belgian female volleyball player, playing as a setter. She is part of the Belgium women's national volleyball team.

She competed at the 2015 European Games and 2015 Women's European Volleyball Championship. On club level she plays for Asterix Kieldrecht.

References

External links
http://worldgrandprix.2016.fivb.com/en/group1/competition/teams/bel-belgium/players/jasmien-biebauw?id=51489
http://www.cev.lu/competition-area/PlayerDetails.aspx?TeamID=9729&PlayerID=1817&ID=837
http://es.scoresway.com/teams/belarus/?sport=volleyball&page=player&id=6552

1990 births
Living people
Belgian women's volleyball players
Place of birth missing (living people)
Volleyball players at the 2015 European Games
European Games competitors for Belgium
Setters (volleyball)
21st-century Belgian women